Schmale is a surname. Notable people with the surname include:

Antonia Schmale (born 1980), German former footballer
Jamie Schmale, Canadian politician
Julia Schmale, German environmental scientist

See also 
Schmale Heide, is a 9.5-kilometre-long and roughly 2-kilometre-wide bar on the German island of Rügen
Schmale Gera, is a river of Thuringia, Germany
Schmale Sinn, is a river of Bavaria and Hesse, Germany